All the Dead Ones is a 2020 Brazilian drama film directed by Caetano Gotardo and Marco Dutra. It was selected to compete for the Golden Bear in the main competition section at the 70th Berlin International Film Festival.

Cast
 Mawusi Tulani as Iná
 Clarissa Kiste as Maria
 Carolina Bianchi as Ana
 Thaia Perez as Isabel
 Agyei Augusto as João

Reception

References

External links
 

2020 films
2020 drama films
Brazilian drama films
2020s Portuguese-language films